Diocese of Nashik may refer to:

Roman Catholic Diocese of Nashik
Diocese of Nasik (Church of North India)